Konstantinos Ioannou (born 5 May 1967) is a retired Greek football defender.

References

1967 births
Living people
Egaleo F.C. players
Atromitos F.C. players
Apollon Smyrnis F.C. players
Kalamata F.C. players
Super League Greece players
Association football defenders
Footballers from Athens
Greek footballers